Although a parliamentary democracy, Indian politics has increasing become dynastic, possibly due to the absence of a party organization, independent civil society associations that mobilize support for the party, and centralized financing of elections. Family members have also led the Congress party for most of the period since 1978 when Indira Gandhi floated the then Congress(I) faction of the party. It also  is fairly common in many political parties in Maharashtra.  The dynastic phenomenon is seen from national level down to district level and even village level.The three-tier structure of Panchayati Raj created in the 1960s also helped to create and consolidate this phenomenon in rural areas. Apart from government,political families also control cooperative institutions, mainly cooperative sugar factories, 
district cooperative banks in the state, and since the 1980s private for profit colleges.  The ruling Bharatiya Janata Party also features several senior leaders who are dynasts. In Maharashtra, the NCP has particularly high level of dynasticism.

Below is a partial list of the political families of Maharashtra state in India.

A
The Ambedkar Family

 B. R. Ambedkar (1891 - 1956) - The Father of the Constitution of India, 1st Minister of Law and Justice, Member of Parliament (Rajya Sabha), Labour Member of Viceroy's Executive Council, Leader of the Opposition in the Bombay Legislative Assembly and Member of the Bombay Legislative Council.
Yashwant Ambedkar (1912 - 1977) - Son of B. R. Ambedkar, leader of Republican Party of India and a member of the Maharashtra Legislative Council.
Prakash Ambedkar - Son of Yashwant Ambedkar, leader of the Vanchit Bahujan Aghadi, and the former Member of the Parliament (Lok Sabha and Rajya Sabha).
 Sujat Ambedkar - Son of Prakash Ambedkar, Activist and Leader of the Vanchit Bahujan Aghadi.
 Anandraj Ambedkar - Son of Yashwant Ambedkar, Leader of Republican Sena and the Vanchit Bahujan Aghadi.

B
The Bhosale Family, Satara

▪ Udayanraje Bhosale, Former Minister of State in Maharashtra Government. BJP Member of Rajya sabha

▪ Shivendrasinghraje Bhosale, Member of Legislative Assembly.

The Bhujbal Family
 Chhagan Bhujbal - Member of NCP and Former Deputy Chief Minister of Maharashtra 
Pankaj Bhujbal - Son of Chhagan Bhujbal. Member of Maharashtra Legislative Assembly
 Sameer Bhujbal - Nephew of Chhagan Bhujbal. Member of Maharashtra Legislative Assembly form Nashik (Vidhan Sabha constituency)

'The Bhumre Family,  Paithan
 Sandipanrao Bhumre -  Cabinet minister Maharashtra , member of Maharshtra legislative assembly 5 Term ..

C

Tha Chavan family ( of Bhausaheb Sonba Anaji Chavan) first SC mayer of Pune Municipal corporation, political party RPI (1971-1972)

The Chavan Family (of Dajisaheb)

 Dajisaheb Chavan (1916 – 1973) - Union Deputy Minister for Defence and Law.
 Premala Chavan (1918 – 2003) - Wife of Dajisaheb Chavan. Member of the Lok Sabha and the Rajya Sabha
Prithviraj Chavan - Son of Dajisaheb Chavan. 17th Chief Minister of Maharashtra

The Chavan Family (of Shankarrao)

 Shankarrao Chavan (1920 – 2004)- Union Minister of Finance and Home Affairs and 5th Chief Minister of Maharashtra
 Ashok Chavan - Son of Shankarrao Chavan. 16th Chief Minister of Maharashtra
 Ameeta Ashokrao Chavan - Daughter-in-law of Shankarrao Chavan. Member of Maharashtra Legislative Assembly from Bhokar

D
The Dange Family
 Shripad Amrit Dange - Founding member of the Communist Party of India
 Roza Vidyadhar Deshpande - Member of Parliament from Mumbai North Central

The Dandavate Family
 Madhu Dandavate - Deputy Chairman of the Planning Commission, Minister of Finance, Minister of Railways
 Pramila Dandavate - Member of Parliament from Mumbai North Central

The Danve Family
 Raosaheb Danve - Represents Bhartiya Janata Party in 16th Lok Sabha[1] & formerly Maharashtra President of Bhartiya Janata Party.
Santosh Danve - MLA

The Deshmukh Family
Vilasrao Deshmukh (1945 – August 2012) - MP in the Rajya Sabha, Indian Minister of Science & Technology and Minister of Earth Sciences, former Minister of Heavy Industries and Public Enterprises, former Minister of Rural Development and Minister of Panchayati Raj, Former Chief Minister of Maharashtra for 2 Terms -
Amit Deshmukh, son of Vilasrao Deshmukh - Cabinet Minister & Guardian Minister of Latur.
Dhiraj Deshmukh; third son of Ex. CM Vilasrao Deshmukh and Younger brother of Amit Deshmukh - MLA Member of Legislative Assembly Latur Rural Constituency
Diliprao Deshmukh; Younger Brother Of Vilasrao Deshmukh - Former Minister For Sports Maharashtra Government & Guardian Minister For Latur

The Deora Family

Murli Deora Former Cabinet Minister Central Government
Milind Deora Former Minister of Central Government, Son of Murli Deora

The Dutt Family

Sunil Dutt Ex. Member of Parliament Lok Sabha
Priya Dutt Ex. Member of Parliament, daughter of Sunil Dutt

F
The Fadnavis Family
Devendra Fadnavis - He served as the 18th Chief Minister of Maharashtra (CM), in office from 31 October 2014 to 8 November 2019. He was the first Chief Minister of Maharashtra from Bharatiya Janata Party BJP.
Shobha Fadnavis - Member of Maharashtra Legislative Council and aunt of Devendra Fadnavis

G
The Gadakh Family
Yashwantrao Gadakh Patil - is a veteran leader of Nationalist Congress Party from Maharashtra. He served as Member of Parliament for 3 terms, also served as Member of legislative council.
Shankarrao Gadakh - current Cabinet Minister of Government of Maharashtra. He was elected as an independent Member of the legislative assembly in 2019 for the second time, and later announced his support to Shivsena.

The Gaikwad Family
 Eknath Gaikwad
 Varsha Gaikwad – current Cabinet Minister of Maharashtra. She is a four term Member of the Maharashtra Legislative Assembly
Sunil Baliram Gaikwad – Member of Parliament 16th Lok Sabha from latur

The Gavai Family

 R. S. Gavai - Governor, MP (Lok Sabha & Rajya Sabha), MLC 
 Rajendra Gavai – Son of R. S. Gavai and President of Republican Party of India (Gavai)

The Gholap Family
 Babanrao Gholap - Cabinet Minister of Social Welfare in Maharashtra Government
 Yogesh Gholap - Son of Babanrao. Member of the 13th Maharashtra Legislative Assembly from Deolali Vidhan Sabha constituency as member of Shiv Sena

H

K
The Khadse Family, Jalgaon
Eknath Khadse, Former Agriculture Minister of Maharashtra. Currently in NCP
Raksha Khadse, Daughter-in-law of Eknath Khadse, BJP MP from Raver constituency

The Khan Family, Parbhani
Abdul Rahman Khan, Former member of Bombay Legislative Council, Maharashtra Legislative Assembly and Maharashtra Legislative Council
Irfan ur Rahman Khan, Son of Abdul Rahman Khan, Ex Secretary of Maharashtra Pradesh Congress Committee and Ex Vice President of Maharashtra Youth Congress

The Khatal Patil Family, Sangamner
 B.J.Khatal-Patil, Former Minister of State for Co-operation, Planning etc and Minister of Cabinet for Law & Judiciary, Food & Civil Supplies, Irrigation, PWD, Revenue etc and Congress Member for Maharashtra Legislative Assembly

The Kshirsagar Family, Beed
Kesharbai Kshirsagar, Former Member of Parliament, Lok Sabha and Maharashtra Legislative Assembly
Jaydutt Kshirsagar, son of Kesharbai Kshirsagar, Former Minister of public works department and a Shivsena member of Maharashtra Legislative Assembly

M
The Mohite Family, Solapur

 Shankarrao Mohite-Patil - Member of the Bombay State Legislative Assembly from 1952 to 1960 as well as in Maharashtra Legislative Assembly from 1960 to 1972
 Vijaysinh Mohite–Patil - Son of Shankarao. Former Deputy Chief Minister of Maharashtra State.
 Ranjitsinh Mohite-Patil - Son of Vijaysinh. Former Member of Rajya Sabha.
 Pratapsinh Mohite-Patil - Minister for Cooperation in the Shiv Sena-led state government in the late-90s under Narayan Rane as well as member of 13th Lok Sabha from Solapur

The Mahadik Family, Kolhapur
Amal Mahadik - Son of Appa Mahadik. Former MLA from Kolhapur South (2014 to 2019). 
Dhananjay Mahadik - Nephew of Appa Mahadik - Former Member of Parliament Kolhapur (2014 to 2019), current Member of Parliament Rajya Sabha.  

The Mahajan Family
 Pramod Mahajan (1949 – 2006) - Parliamentary affairs minister in Atal Bihari Vajpayee government 
 Poonam Mahajan - Daughter of Pramod Mahajan. BJP member of Parliament from Mumbai North Central

The Munde Family
 Gopinath Munde (1949-2014) - Deputy Chief Minister of Maharashtra, Union Minister for Rural Development and Panchayati Raj in Narendra Modi's Cabinet. Brother-in-law of Pramod Mahajan
 Pankaja Munde - Daughter of Gopinath Munde.Ex.Minister of Rural Development, Women and Child Welfare in Devendra Fadnavis government
 Pritam Munde - Younger daughter of Gopinath Munde. BJP Member of Parliament from Beed
 Dhananjay Munde - Nephew of Gopinath Munde, former Cabinet Minister in the  Government of Maharashtra. Member of NCP

N
 The Naik Family (of Vasantrao)
   Vasantrao Naik, 4th Chief Minister of Maharashtra, Former Member of Parliament. The longest served Chief Minister of State.
  Avinash Naik, son of Vasantrao Naik, Former Minister of state. 
   Sudhakarrao Naik,Nephew of Vasantarao Naik, Former Chief Minister of Maharashtra, Former Member of Parliament. Founder member of Nationalist Congress Party 
 Nilay Naik, Nephew of Sudhakarrao Naik, Member of Legislative Council, Former President of Zilha Parishad Yavatmal. 
 Manohar Naik, brother of Sudhkarrao Naik, Ex Cabinet Minister of Maharashtra, Leader of Nationalist Congress Party
   Indranil Naik,son of Manohar Naik, MLA. 

The Naik Family
   Ganesh Naik, Member of legislative assembly and Ex Minister of State excise and non conventional energy, Maharashtra
 Sanjeev Naik, Ex. Member of Parliament Lok Sabha, Ex.Mayor of Navi Mumbai Municipal Corporation
 Sandeep Naik, Ex.Member of Legislative Assembly

P
The Pawar Family, Baramati
Sharad Pawar - Former Agriculture Minister of India, Member Of Parliament Rajya Sabha
Supriya Sule - Daughter of Sharad Pawar, Member, Lok Sabha Baramati Constituency
Ajit Pawar - Nephew of Sharad Pawar; Former Deputy Chief Minister of Maharashtra State
Parth Pawar - Son of Ajit Pawar, Grandnephew of Sharad Pawar
Rohit Rajendra Pawar - Grandson of Sharad Pawar, Nephew of Supriya Sule and Ajit Pawar Member of Maharashtra Legislative Assembly Karjat Jamkhed Constituency

The Patil family Nilanga
Shivajirao Patil Nilangekar - Ex. Chief Minister of Maharashtra State
Sambhaji Patil Nilangekar -Ex.Cabinet Minister of Maharashtra state, Nephew of Shivajirao Patil Nilangekar. member of BJP

The Vikhe Patil family Nagar
Balasaheb Vikhe Patil Ex. Member of Parliament Lok Sabha. Member of Congress party
Radhakrishna Vikhe Patil Cabinet Ministerin Government of  Maharashtra. Son of Balasaheb Vikhe Patil. Member of BJP
Sujay Vikhe Patil BJP Member of Parliament Lok Sabha, Son of Radhakrishna Vikhe Patil & Grandson of Balasaheb Vikhe Patil

The Patil Family Kolhapur
D. Y. Patil - Former Governor of Bihar, India
Satej Patil - MLC, State Minister & Guardian Minister of Kolhapur District, Maharashtra

The Patil Family Tasgaon (Sangli)
R. R. Patil - Ex.Deputy Chief Minister and Cabinet minister of Maharashtra State
Suman Patil - Member of Legislative Assembly, Wife of R. R. Patil

The Patil Family Sangali
Rajarambapu Patil - Former Member of legislative assembly Maharashtra.In the 1960s and 70s, he was influential in establishing many cooperative instituitions such as a bank and a Sugar factory in sangli district. 
Jayant Patil - Cabinet Minister of Maharashtra State, Son of Rajarambapu Patil

 The Purohit Family 
Raj K. Purohit - BJP Chief Whip of Maharashtra Legislative Assembly (Cabinet Minister)

The Paranjape Family
Paranjape Prakash Vishvanath - Shiv Sena MP from Thane Lok Sabha.
Anand Paranjpe - Son of Prakash Paranjape. Industrialist and member of the 15th Lok Sabha from Kalyan representing the NCP.

RThe Rane Family Narayan Rane - Chief Minister of Maharashtra (1999) under the Shiv sena BJP coalition government
 Nilesh Narayan Rane - Member of Parliament from Ratnagiri-Sindhudurg. Son of Narayan Rane. Member of BJP
 Nitesh Narayan Rane - Member of Maharashtra Legislative Assembly form Kankavli. Son of Narayan Rane.Member of BJP

S The Satav Family, HingoliRajni Satav ( Ex Minister of State Maharashtra)
Rajeev Satav (Ex MLA , Ex MP Loksabha , Ex MP Rajya Sabha, Former IYC President)
Pradnya Rajeev Satav (MLC and Vice President Maharashtra Pradesh Congress Committee )The Solanke Family, Beed▪ Sundarrao Solanke - Patil, Former Deputy Chief Minister of Maharashtra State(1978-1980), Unopposed MLA in 1972, First President of Beed Zilla Parishad.

 Prakashdada Sundarrao Solanke, Former Minister of State for Revenue in Maharashtra Government (2009-2012).The Shinde Family, SolapurSushilkumar Shinde, Former Central Home Minister of India, Former Ministry of Power, Former Governor of AndhraPradesh, Former Chief Minister of Mahrashtra.
Praniti Shinde, Member of Legislative Assembly from Solapur City Central, Mahrashtra, AICC Media Panelist. Daughter of SushilkumarThe Shirole (Patil) Family, Pune.
 Anil Shirole, Ex-Member of Parliament from Pune. BJP member
 Siddharth Shirole, Present Member of Legislative Assembly Maharashtra from Shivajinagar Assembly Constituency Pune. BJP memberThe Shinde family, ThaneEknath Shinde, 20th Chief minister of Maharashtra, Member of Legislative Assembly from Kopri-Pachpakhadi, Maharashtra, Leader of Shiv Sena Party, former Cabinet Minister of PWD in Maharashtra State Government (2014-2019), Appointed as Guardian minister of Thane District (2014-2019)
Shrikant Shinde, Member of Parliament 16th Lok Sabha from kalyan constituency, Maharashtra, Son of Eknath ShindeThe Siddique Family, MumbaiBaba Siddique, Former Minister of state for civil supplies, food, labour and FDA, former member of Maharashtra Legislative Assembly
Zeeshan Siddique, Son of Baba Siddique, Member of Maharashtra Legislative Assembly from Bandra west

TThe Thackeray Family, MumbaiBal Thackeray (Balasaheb) (1926 – 2012) - founder leader and former chairperson of the Shiv Sena
Uddhav Thackeray, Former Chief Minister Of Maharashtra; leader and chairperson of the Shiv Sena (UBT); son of Balasaheb Thackeray
Aditya Thackeray, Minister (Environment and climate, Tourism, Protocol), Government of Maharashtra; founder and president of Yuva Sena; son of Uddhav Thackeray
Raj Thackeray, nephew of Balasaheb. Founded and heads the breakaway faction called Maharashtra Navnirman SenaThe Thorat Family, AhmednagarBhausaheb thorat, Bhausaheb Thorat was a peasant leader and worked as a freedom fighter in the freedom struggle in Maharashtra and a one-time legislator from Sangamner constituency. 
Balasaheb Thorat, son of Bhausaheb thorat and he is a senior member of the Congress Party. He is an MLA from Sangamner constituency. He served as the revenue minister in Maharashtra.
He also served as the Deputy Leader of the Opposition in the Maharashtra Legislative Assembly.The Tambe Family, Ahmednagar Dr. Durgatai Tambe, Daughter of Bhausaheb thorat & Sister of Balasaheb Thorat and Mayor of Sangamner Municipal Council. 
Dr. Sudhir Tambe Patil, is son-in-law of Bhausaheb Thorat and he is former member of the Maharashtra Legislative Council from the Nashik Graduate constituency for 3 continuous terms.
Satyajeet Tambe Patil is Son of Dr. Sudhir Tambe Patil & He is also the nephew of Balasaheb Thorat and he is a member of the Maharashtra Legislative Council from the Nashik Graduate constituency. And he was the President of Maharashtra Pradesh Youth Congress.The Tatkare Family, Raigad, Roha Sunil Tatkare
 Aditi Sunil Tatkare
Aniket Tatkare

ZThe Zanak FamilySubhash Zanak - Son of Ramrao. Former Cabinet Minister For Women and Child Welfare, Ashok Chavan's Ministry. Member of Congress party
Amit Subhashrao Zanak - Son of Subhash and grandson of Ramrao. Legislator in Maharashtra assembly. Member of Congress partyThe Zakaria Family'''
Rafiq Zakaria Former Deputy Chairman, Rajya Sabha & Cabinet Minister in Maharashtra
Asif Zakaria - Son of Ahmed, Municipal Corporator, Ward No. 101 & Member - Standing Committee, Municipal Corporation of Greater Mumbai.

References 

 
Lists of people from Maharashtra